Kordhocë is a village in the Gjirokastër County in Albania. At the 2015 local government reform it became part of the municipality Gjirokastër. It is known for the Kordhocë bridge.

Geography

Kordhocë is a village just outside Gjirokastër, situated on mountain slope of Mali i Gjerë.

Population
Kordhocë is inhabited by Muslim Albanians.

Economy
The main activity is agriculture, especially animal husbandry. The area is known for its dairy products.

References

Villages in Gjirokastër County